Trut may refer to:

 Drude, in south Germany, a type of malevolent nocturnal spirit 
 Truc, a 15th century card game from Occitania in France and the Basque region of Spain